Czeslaw Kozon (born 17 November 1951, Idestrup, Falster, Denmark) is the Roman Catholic bishop of the Diocese of Copenhagen.

His parents were emigres from Communist Poland. He was ordained a priest for the Diocese of Copenhagen on 6 January 1979. In 1995 Pope John Paul II appointed him Bishop of Copenhagen; he was consecrated by Bishop Hans Ludvig Martensen, S.J. on 7 May 1995.

References

Sources
 

Living people
1951 births
20th-century Roman Catholic bishops in Denmark
21st-century Roman Catholic bishops in Denmark
Danish people of Polish descent
People from Guldborgsund Municipality
Danish Roman Catholic bishops